This is a complete list of Morecambe and Wise's appearances.

Television

Original appearances
 Running Wild (1954) first television appearance of the double act, not well received
 The Bob Monkhouse Hour (1959) guest appearances only within the variety-based show
 The Ed Sullivan Show (1964) various appearances within the famous programme
 Two of a Kind (1961) their first "own" show, shown on commercial television
 The Morecambe & Wise Show (1968) often called the golden years, with the "beeb"
 The Morecambe & Wise Show (1978) their last shows, for commercial television

Other appearances
 Atari computer adverts (1982)
 The Sweeney (1978) "Hearts and Minds" episode

Compilations
 The Best of Morecambe & Wise (1977), rebroadcast as Morecambe & Wise At The BBC
 The Morecambe & Wise Show (Various)
 The Adventures Of Morecambe & Wise (1996)
 I Worked With Morecambe & Wise...And Look What Happened To Me! (1997)
 The Sunshine Boys (1998)
 Morecambe & Wise : Encore! (1995)

Tributes & retrospectives
 Fools Rush In shown as part of the "Omnibus" documentary series, from their fifth series
 Bring Me Sunshine (1984) tribute in aid of the British Heart Foundation from the London Palladium
 "The Importance Of Being Ernie" (1990) a special programme in the Omnibus strand focussing on Ernie
 Bring Me Sunshine (1994) tribute to Eric Morecambe marking the 10th anniversary of his death
 The Heart & Soul of Eric Morecambe (1998) comprehensive documentary focussing on health issues
 The Unforgettable Eric Morecambe (2 November 2001) compilation and tribute programme with new interviews
 The Unseen Eric Morecambe (2005) documentary compiled using interviews and home movie footage
 Morecambe & Wise: Greatest Moments (2007) countdown show with interviews and new footage of guests
 Morecambe and Wise: In Their Own Words (2007) the story of the duo's struggle for fame using rare clips
 The Show What Paul Merton Did (2008) clip show with studio interviews including writers and family members
 Eric & Ernie (2010) one-off drama following the very earliest years of the duo's journey to success
 Eric & Ernie: Behind The Scenes (2010) charting the careers of the duo and making of the above drama
 The Unforgettable Ernie Wise (26 December 2011) compilation and tribute programme with new interviews
 Bring Me Morecambe & Wise (20 December 2013) retrospective with clips, interviews and unseen footage
 Morecambe & Wise: The Greatest Moment (14 December 2014) clip show featuring a top twenty public-voted sketch rundown
 Morecambe & Wise Forever (20-21 April 2017) archive footage, interviews, clips and reunions of cast and crew members
 Eric, Ernie & Me (22 December 2011) one-off drama showcasing the relationship of the duo's BBC years with Eddie Braben

Film
 The Intelligence Men (1965)
 The Magnificent Two (1966)
 That Riviera Touch (1967)
 The Passionate Pilgrim (1984) (Eric Morecambe only)
 Night Train to Murder (1984)

Radio
 Youth Must Have Its Swing Home Service 4 May – 15 June 1943
 You're Only Young Once Three Series, 1953-1954
 The Show Goes On Light Programme 1955
 The Morecambe & Wise Show Home Service 1955
 Laughter Incorporated Light Programme 1958
 The Morecambe & Wise Show Light Programme 1966
 Morecambe & Wise Sing Flanagan and Allen Radio Two 1971
 Eric & Ernie Play Morecambe & Wise Radio Four 1972
 Eric & Ernie's Hall of Fame Radio Four 1974
 Eric & Ernie's Second Hall of Fame Radio Four 1975
 The Eric Morecambe & Ernie Wise Show Three Series 1975-1978
 Wise on the Wireless Ernie Only, After Eric's Death 1987-1988

Books
 Eric & Ernie : The Autobiography Of Morecambe & Wise (1973)
 Morecambe & Wise : There's No Answer To That! (1981)
 Morecambe & Wife (Joan Morecambe) (1987)
 Still On My Way To Hollywood (Ernie Wise) (1991)
 Behind the Sunshine (Gary Morecambe & Martin Sterling) (1993)
 Morecambe & Wise - You Can't See The Join (Jeremy Novick) (1994)
 Life's Not Hollywood, It's Cricklewood (Gary Morecambe) (2004)
 Morecambe & Wise Unseen (William Cook) (2007)

References

External links
 Eric And Ern - Keeping The Magic Alive **Book, Film, TV Reviews, Interviews**
 The Morecambe & Wise homepage

Morecambe and Wise joint appearances
Morecambe and Wise joint appearances